Corno do Bico Protected Landscape is a protected landscape in Portugal, entirely located in Paredes de Coura. It is one of the 30 areas which are officially under protection in the country.

It is composed by wood and grassland pasture systems and well preserved oak forests and it is a habitat to various native and European flora and fauna species like the Iberian wolf, the Pyrenean desman, the European otter, the palmate newt, the genet, the European roe deer and the wild boar.

References

External links
Corno do Bico at the ICNB website 

Paredes de Coura
Protected areas established in 1999
Protected landscapes of Portugal
Geography of Viana do Castelo District
Natura 2000 in Portugal
1999 establishments in Portugal